Annaside is a hamlet in Cumbria, England. Annaside is primarily an agricultural settlement and takes its name from the River Annas which flows past the settlement. The Cumbria Coastal Way passes along Annaside Banks here.

References

External links

Villages in Cumbria
Bootle, Cumbria